M.S. Krishna Iyer (born 1934 or 1935, Thrissur, Kerala, India), also known as Ambi Swamy, was an Indian chef and a restaurateur. He was instrumental in bringing vegetarian dishes to masses in Kerala from the temples. Swamy started his cooking at the age of 17 and has organised cooking for big programmes like Kerala School Kalolsavam. He died in 2012. He was survived by seven sons and two daughters.

References

1934 births
Chefs of Indian cuisine
Indian chefs
Businesspeople from Thrissur
2012 deaths